Cameron "Cam" Zink (born March 8, 1986) is an American professional freeride mountain bike rider and X Games athlete.

Personal life
Zink is from Carson City, Nevada. He started mountain biking at age 9 and when he was 16 won the junior national championship in dual slalom. He was signed by the Santa Cruz Syndicate team when he was 17. Until he was 20, he continued to race while also competing in Slopestyle.

Career
In 2009 Zink founded Sensus, a company that manufactures bike grips.

In 2010 he won Red Bull Rampage and was awarded best trick for an almost 40-foot 360 drop, and also won the FMB World Tour season title. In 2013 he won best trick for a 78-foot backflip, after having been forbidden by a doctor to ride. In 2013 he finished 4th Overall in Munich X-Games Slopestyle event. In 2014 he placed 2nd in Red Bull Rampage and won best trick with the biggest 360 in history of the event.

On August 21, 2014, Mammoth Mountain at World of X-Games, he set the world record for the farthest backflip on a bicycle with a 100-foot, 3 inch flip. In 2006 and 2010 he won Crankworx Slopestyle (now Joyride) in Whistler, British Columbia.

In April 2021, X-Games would bring back mountain biking this time to a REAL series format. Zink's video submission would be enough to win his first X-Games medal.

References

Living people
1986 births
American male cyclists
American mountain bikers
Sportspeople from Reno, Nevada
Freeride mountain bikers